The 2011–12 Mid-American Conference women's basketball season began with practices in October 2011, followed by the start of the 2011–12 NCAA Division I women's basketball season in November. Conference play began in January 2012 and concluded in March 2012. Bowling Green won the regular season title with a record of 14–2 by one game over Eastern Michigan and Toledo. Tavelyn James of Eastern Michigan was named MAC player of the year.

Third seeded Eastern won the MAC tournament over fifth seeded Central Michigan. Tavelyn James of Eastern Michigan was the tournament MVP. Eastern Michigan lost to South Carolina in the first round of the NCAA tournament. Bowling Green, Central Michigan, Miami, and Toledo played in the WNIT.

Preseason awards
The preseason poll and league awards were announced by the league office on November 1, 2011.

Preseason women's basketball poll
(First place votes in parenthesis)

East Division
 
 
 
 
 Ohio

West Division

Tournament champs
Toledo

Honors

Postseason

Mid–American tournament

NCAA tournament

Women's National Invitational Tournament

Postseason awards

Coach of the Year: Curt Miller, Bowling Green
Player of the Year: Tavelyn James, Eastern Michigan
Freshman of the Year: Claire Jakubicek, Northern Illinois
Defensive Player of the Year: Andola Dortch, Toledo
Sixth Man of the Year: Jalisa Olive, Central Michigan

Honors

See also
2011–12 Mid-American Conference men's basketball season

References